Rodach is a river of Bavaria and of Thuringia, Germany. It is a left tributary of the Itz near Itzgrund. It passes through Bad Rodach.

See also

List of rivers of Bavaria
List of rivers of Thuringia

References

Rivers of Bavaria
Rivers of Thuringia
Coburg (district)
Haßberge (district)
Rivers of Germany